Martha H. Mowry (June 7 1818 – August 29, 1899) was an American physician, the first woman physician in the state of Rhode Island. Her greatest achievement was in aiding the opening up the field of medicine for women in the U.S. She was also a pioneer in the suffrage cause and in many reforms for human welfare.

Early life and  education
Martha Harris Mowry was born in Providence, Rhode Island, June 7 1818. Her parents were Thomas (died June 1872) and Martha Harris Mowry (died August 1818). Her mother died when young Martha was eight weeks old. Her father was a merchant in Providence. The young Martha was reared by her aunt (father's sister), Miss Amey Mowry, who inspired her young niece with a fondness for literature, science and study.

Mowry attended the schools of Miss Sterry and Miss Chace, in Providence, and in 1825, she was sent to an academy in care of a Methodist minister's widow, Mrs. Walker's academy. In 1827, she became a student in the Friends' Yearly Meeting Boarding School, in Providence, where she remained until 1831. She next went to Miss Latham's select boarding-school, and later to Miss Winsor's young ladies' boarding-school. While in that school, she was prostrated by fright and over exertion, being pursued by strange men so that she and two other girls were obliged to run a distance of a mile and a quarter to reach the school. Heart debility, aggravated by this, retarded her progress four years. During those four years, an enforced quiet period, she studied various branches, such as mathematics, Latin, Greek and Hebrew. She also read extensively, and especially the works of the ancient philosophers. After her health was restored, she studied in the Green Street Select School, in Providence.

After leaving the school, she kept up her studies, with increasing interest in languages and oriental literature. Later, she was a student in the Green Street Select School when Margaret Fuller (afterward "Countess Ossili"), was a prominent teacher. She pursued her studies after leaving school and while engaged in overseeing the domestic work of the household composed of her father and herself.

In 1844, chiefly heeding suggestions of physicians who, at different times, had noticed her interest in anatomy and physiology and cognate branches, she began to study in these directions, with a purpose. At this time, no woman was admitted into medical colleges, and a strong current of professional prejudice opposed the admission of women into practice. Against this tide, Mowry and the few women who dared to face it were obliged to press their way. But even so, she had not formed the intention of publicly practicing medicine. Having access to the libraries of practicing physicians, and reviewing with them, at different times with Doctors Briggs, Fabyan, Fowler and Mauran, she continued this line of study until they told her that she only needed opportunities for dissection beyond what skeleton or manakin could show. She then studied under the direction of Doctor De Bonneville and his wife, who were professors in magnetism, and he in homeopathy, and when, in 1849, they removed from the city, they gave her a testimonial expressing their confidence in her ability to treat diseases.

In the winter of 1849-50, she was requested to take charge of a medical college for women in Boston, Massachusetts. She spent some months in close study, to fit herself for work, and under the instruction of able and experienced physicians, such as Dr. Cornell, Dr. Page, Dr. Gregory and others, she soon became proficient.

Career
About 1850 she spent six months in close study in Boston, under the supervision of Doctor Cornell, a physician of good standing there. About that time, Doctor Paige came to Providence as a lecturer and instructor in electropathy, and formed a class for instruction. She joined that class, also took private lessons, and in due time, received a diploma for faithful study and attainment. By special requests of friends, she subsequently gave many lectures before physiological societies and in different villages. In recognition of such services and their appreciation she received a silver cup from the Providence Physiological Society, and later mementoes from other societies. Her superior attainments thus became known and her reputation extended throughout a wider sphere than she knew.

In 1853, she was visited by a committee from Philadelphia Female Medical College, which had been founded in 1850, and without making known their purpose to her, in the course of an informal interview with her, investigated her knowledge of allopathic medicine subjects until they were abundantly satisfied of her knowledge, and on their return, she received from the college a diploma conferring upon her the degree of M.D., with signatures of the college faculty. This was followed, a week later, by an appointment to a professorship of obstetrics and diseases of women and children in the Female Medical College of Pennsylvania. With great reluctance, her father consented that she should go to Philadelphia, Pennsylvania to occupy the position offered, and she did so, in 1853-4. Among her auditors, when she was introduced and delivered her first address, were Lydia Maria Child and Lucretia Mott.

Her work in the college was pleasant and successful, but her father desired to have her with him, and she returned to Providence. Her father presented her with a horse and chaise, and thereafter, for nearly 40 years, she constantly kept one or two horses in use in her rounds of practice.

In 1880 she partially retired from practice, but the demands upon her seemed so pressing that she consented in 1882 to resume work under limitations absolving her from going out nights except in extreme cases.  She was especially interested in educating mothers regarding the laws of life, physical, mental and spiritual.

Mowry supported woman suffrage, and appeared in a convention held in Worcester, Mass., where she was introduced by Mott. She was a trustee of the Woman's Educational and Industrial Union of Providence, a member of the Rhode Island Woman's Club, and vice-president for her State of the Association for the Advancement of Women.

Death
She died in Providence from apoplexy, August 29, 1899.

References

Attribution

Bibliography

External links
 

1818 births
1899 deaths
People from Providence, Rhode Island
19th-century American physicians
19th-century American women physicians
American suffragists
Wikipedia articles incorporating text from A Woman of the Century